Castello della Manta is a castle at Manta near Saluzzo, Province of Cuneo, region of Piedmont, in northern Italy.

The original building, dating from the 12th century, was later enlarged and transformed into a noble residence by the Saluzzo della Manta family, margraves of Saluzzo.

Among the numerous rooms, the Baronial Hall (Salone Baronale) is notable for the fresco cycle decorating its walls, a rare masterpiece of Late Gothic painting in northern Italy. The work is attributed to the anonymous Master of Castello della Manta. The cycle, completed soon after 1420, portrays the Nove Prodi, the Nine Worthies with their Nine Female Heroines. The artist may have used as models  members of the House of the Margraves of Saluzzo. The figures are shown  wearing precious contemporary clothing. Also depicted is  the so-called Fountain of Youth, a theme taken from the tradition of French medieval stories. The scene is inspired by the poem by Marquess Thomas III of Saluzzo, Le Chevalier Errant).

The Sala delle Grottesche was decorated in the Mannerist style of the 16th century, and was commissioned by Count Michele Antonio della Manta around 1560. It has a finely painted ceiling, decorated with stuccoes, grotesques, ancient ruins and buildings.

Annexed to the castle is the church, whose apse has a series of frescoes about the life of Christ dating from the same time as the Baronial Hall decorations.

See also
List of castles in Italy

External links
Manta castle at Fondo per l'Ambiente

Buildings and structures in the Province of Cuneo
Manta
Gothic art
Fondo Ambiente Italiano
Museums in Piedmont
Historic house museums in Italy
Marquisate of Saluzzo